Oratorium is the sixth album by Norwegian gothic doom metal band Funeral. It is the first album not to include longtime singer Frode Forsmo, and the first to feature In Vain vocalist Sindre Nedland.

Track listing

Credits

Band members
 Anders Eek – Drums, Guitars, Backing vocals
 Sindre Nedland (In Vain) – Lead vocals
 Rune Gandrud – Bass guitar
 Erlend E. Nybø – Guitars
 Mats Lerberg – Guitars, Vocals

Production
 Anders Eek – Producer
 Simen Hogdal Pedersen – Producer
 Øyvind Voldmo Larsen – Mixing
 Simen Andreassen – Mastering
 Erlend E. Nybo – Cover art
 Magnus Steenhoff – Photography

References

2012 albums
Funeral (band) albums